Micah Hyde may refer to:

 Micah Hyde (footballer) (born 1974), English-born Jamaican footballer
 Micah Hyde (American football) (born 1990), American football safety